A bureaucrat is a member of a bureaucracy and can compose the administration of any organization of any size, although the term usually connotes someone within an institution of government.

The term bureaucrat derives from "bureaucracy", which in turn derives from the French "bureaucratie" first known from the 18th century.  Bureaucratic work had already been performed for many centuries. In countries such as India, Bangladesh and Pakistan, bureaucrats are known to be the officials that run the government sector at administrative levels as well as ministerial levels and also they are known as executives that run the corporate sector at managerial and directorial level.

Role in society
Bureaucrats play various roles in modern society, by virtue of holding administrative, functional, and managerial positions in government. They carry out the day-to-day implementation of enacted policies for central government agencies, such as postal services, education and healthcare administration, and various regulatory bodies.

Types of bureaucrats

Bureaucrats can be split into different categories based on the system, nationality, and time they come from.
 Classical – someone who starts at a low level of public work and does not have to express opinions of their own in their professional capacities. They follow policy guidelines and gain increasing ranks within the system. Tax collectors, government accountants, police officers, fire fighters, and military personnel are examples of classical bureaucrats.
 American bureaucrats – these are different from other types because they operate within a republican form of government, and the political culture traditionally seeks to limit their power. 
 Chinese bureaucrats, also called "Mandarin bureaucrats" – Mandarins were important from 605 to 1905 CE. The Zhou dynasty is the earliest recording of Chinese bureaucrats. There was a 9 rank system, each rank having more power than the lower rank. This type of bureaucrat went on until the Qing dynasty. After 1905, the Mandarins were replaced by modern civil servants. In 1949, the Communist Party took over China, and by their theory, all people were bureaucrats who worked for the government.
 European – originally referred to as "Mandarins" stemming from the Chinese word for government employee. Bureaucracy didn't catch on in Europe very much due to the many different governments in the region, and constant change and advancement, and relative freedom of the upper class. With the translation of Confucian texts during the Enlightenment, the concept of a meritocracy reached intellectuals in the West, who saw it as an alternative to the traditional ancien regime of Europe. Voltaire and François Quesnay wrote favourably of the idea, with Voltaire claiming that the Chinese had "perfected moral science" and Quesnay advocating an economic and political system modeled after that of the Chinese. The implementation of His Majesty's Civil Service as a systematic, meritocratic civil service bureaucracy, followed the Northcote–Trevelyan Report of 1854 which was influenced by of the ancient Chinese imperial examination. This system was modeled on the imperial examinations system and  bureaucracy of China based on the suggestion of Northcote–Trevelyan Report. Thomas Taylor Meadows, Britain's consul in Guangzhou, China argued in his Desultory Notes on the Government and People of China, published in 1847, that "the long duration of the Chinese empire is solely and altogether owing to the good government which consists in the advancement of men of talent and merit only," and that the British must reform their civil service by making the institution meritocratic. In 1958, though, after the formation of the European Union the job of the Bureaucrat became extremely important to help organize and govern such a large and diverse community. In 1961 the term Eurocrat was coined by Richard Mayne, a journalist at the time. A Eurocrat is a bureaucrat of the European Union.
 Modern Bureaucrat - Bureaucrats gained increasingly negative reputations throughout the second half of the 20th century. As populations grow it becomes harder for bureaucratic systems to work because it often involves a lot of paperwork, which increases processing times, which eventually will be nearly impossible to manage. The digital age and the Internet have revolutionized Bureaucrats and the modern Bureaucrat has a different skill set than before. Also, the internet lowers the corruption levels of some Bureaucratic entities such as the Police Force due to social media and pro–am journalism.

Attributes of bureaucrats
German sociologist Max Weber defined a bureaucratic official as the following:

 They are personally free and appointed to their position on the basis of conduct.
 They exercise the authority delegated to them in accordance with impersonal rules, and their loyalty is enlisted on behalf of the faithful execution of their official duties.
 Their appointment and job placement are dependent upon their technical qualifications.
 Their administrative work is a full-time occupation.
 Their work is rewarded by a regular salary and prospects of advancement in a lifetime career.
 They must exercise their judgment and their skills, but their duty is to place these at the service of a higher authority. Ultimately they are responsible only for the impartial execution of assigned tasks and must sacrifice their personal judgment if it runs counter to their official duties.
 Bureaucratic control is the use of rules, regulations, and formal authority to guide performance. It includes such things as budgets, statistical reports, and performance appraisals to regulate behavior and results.

As an academic, Woodrow Wilson, later a US president, professed in his 1887 article The Study of Administration:

See also
 Civil servant
 Apparatchik
 Mandarin (bureaucrat)
 Nomenklatura
 Salaryman
 Teleadministration
 The Man from U.N.C.L.E.

References

Further reading

External links

 John Kilcullen, Mq.edu.au, Lecture—Max Weber: On Bureaucracy
 Ludwig von Mises, Mises.org, Bureaucracy
 National Association of Professional Bureaucrats

Bureaucratic organization
Government occupations
Public administration